Alexis Selena Railsback (born September 8, 1995) is an American makeup artist and beauty pageant titleholder who was crowned Miss Kansas USA 2015 and then competed at Miss USA 2015 on July 12, 2015.

Personal life 
Railsback was born September 8, 1995, in Overland Park, Kansas to John and Robin Railsback and is of Mexican and German descent. She has a twin sister, Ashley, and a younger brother, Jordan. She attended Shawnee Mission West High School and graduated from Shawnee Mission Northwest High School in May 2014.  She attends Johnson County Community College.

Pageant career 
Railsback  was a semifinalist in Miss Kansas Teen USA 2014 and 4th runner-up to Miss Kansas Teen USA 2013.  She was crowned Miss Kansas USA 2015 in November 2014.  In June 2015 she represented the state of Kansas in Miss USA 2015 pageant, where she was the youngest contestant.

When NBC, Univision and Telemundo pulled their coverage of the event, following pageant co-owner Donald Trump's derogatory comments about Mexicans, Railsback, a third generation Mexican-American was quoted in the Kansas City Star and repeated in Newsweek:

References 

American beauty pageant winners
Miss USA 2015 delegates
American people of Mexican descent
American people of German descent
Living people
1995 births
Johnson County Community College people
People from Shawnee, Kansas